Sirla Pera (born ) is a Cook Island male weightlifter, competing in the 94 kg category and representing Cook Islands at international competitions. He participated at the 2010 Commonwealth Games in the 94 kg event.

Major competitions

References

1992 births
Living people
Cook Island male weightlifters
Weightlifters at the 2010 Commonwealth Games
Commonwealth Games competitors for the Cook Islands
Place of birth missing (living people)